Hugh le Despenser, 1st Baron le Despenser (c. 1287/1289 – 24 November 1326), also referred to as "the Younger Despenser", was the son and heir of Hugh le Despenser, Earl of Winchester (the Elder Despenser), by his wife Isabella de Beauchamp, daughter of William de Beauchamp, 9th Earl of Warwick. He rose to national prominence as royal chamberlain and a favourite of Edward II of England. Despenser made many enemies amongst the nobility of England. After the overthrow of Edward, he was eventually charged with high treason and ultimately hanged, drawn and quartered.

Titles and possessions
Despenser the Younger rose to become Chamberlain and a close advisor to King Edward II, much as Despenser the Elder had been. Despenser the Younger claimed the Lordship of Glamorgan in 1317 through his wife Eleanor de Clare. He then accumulated more lands in the Welsh Marches and in England. At various points he was a knight of Hanley Castle in Worcestershire, Constable of Odiham Castle, and the Keeper of Bristol Castle, Portchester Castle and Dryslwyn Castle plus their respective towns, and the region of Cantref Mawr in Carmarthenshire.

He was also Keeper of the castles, manor, and lands of Brecknock, Hay, Cantref Selyf, etc., in County Brecon, and also Huntington, Herefordshire, in England.

He was additionally given Wallingford Castle in Berkshire, despite this having previously been given to Queen Isabella of France for life.

Marriage
In May 1306 Despenser was knighted at the Feast of the Swans alongside Prince Edward, and in that summer he married Eleanor de Clare, daughter of powerful noble Gilbert de Clare, and Joan of Acre. Eleanor's grandfather, Edward I, had owed the elder Despenser 2,000 marks, a debt which the marriage settled. When Eleanor's brother, Gilbert, was killed in 1314 at the Battle of Bannockburn, she unexpectedly became one of the three co-heiresses to the rich Gloucester earldom, and in her right, Hugh inherited Glamorgan and other properties. In just a few years Hugh went from a landless knight to one of the wealthiest magnates in the kingdom.

Eleanor was also the niece of the new king, Edward II of England, and this connection brought Despenser closer to the English royal court. He joined the baronial opposition to Piers Gaveston, the king's favourite (and Despenser's brother-in-law, through Gaveston's marriage to Eleanor's sister Margaret). Eager for power and wealth, Despenser seized Tonbridge Castle in 1315, after his brother-in-law's death under the misapprehension that it belonged to his mother-in-law; he relinquished it on discovering that the rightful owner was, in fact, the Archbishop of Canterbury. In 1318 he murdered Llywelyn Bren, a Welsh hostage in his custody.

Eleanor and Hugh had nine children who survived infancy:

Hugh le Despenser (c. 1308/9 – 8 February 1349), Baron le Despenser, who was summoned to Parliament in 1338. At his death without issue, his nephew Edward, son of his brother Edward, was created Baron le Despenser in 1357.
Edward le Despenser (c. 1310 – 30 September 1342), soldier, killed at the siege of Vannes; father of Edward Despenser, Knight of the Garter, who became Baron le Despenser in a new creation of 1357
Isabel le Despenser, Countess of Arundel (c. 1312 – aft. 1356), the first wife of Richard Fitzalan, 10th Earl of Arundel. The marriage was annulled and their child, Edmund, was disinherited.
Joan le Despenser (c. 1314 – 15 November 1384), nun at Shaftesbury Abbey
Gilbert le Despenser (c. 1316 – April 1382)
John le Despenser (c. 1317 – June 1366)
Eleanor le Despenser (c. 1319 – February 1351), nun at Sempringham Priory
Margaret le Despenser (c. August 1323 – 1337), nun at Whatton Priory
Elizabeth le Despenser (c. December 1325 – 13 July 1389), married Maurice de Berkeley, 4th Baron Berkeley.

Political manoeuverings
Despenser became royal chamberlain in 1318. As a royal courtier, he manoeuvred into the affections of King Edward, displacing the previous favourite, Roger d'Amory. This came much to the dismay of the baronage as they saw him both taking their rightful places at court at best, and at worst being the new, worse Gaveston. By 1320 his greed was running free. He also supposedly vowed revenge on Roger Mortimer, because Mortimer's grandfather had killed his own. By 1321 he had earned many enemies in every stratum of society, from Queen Isabella in France, to the barons, to the common people. There was even a plot to kill Despenser by sticking his wax likeness with pins.

Finally the barons took action against King Edward and, at the beseeching of Queen Isabella, forced Despenser and his father into exile in August 1321. However, Edward's intent to summon them back to England was no secret. The king rallied support after an attack against Isabella's party at Leeds Castle, an event possibly orchestrated. Early in the following year, with Mortimer's barons busy putting down uprisings in their lands, the Despensers were able to return. Edward, with the Despensers backing him once more, was able to crush the rebellion, securing first Mortimer's surrender and then that of Lancaster, who was subsequently executed.

King Edward quickly reinstated Despenser as royal favourite. The period from the Despensers' return from exile until the end of Edward II's reign was a time of uncertainty in England. With the main baronial opposition leaderless and weak, having been defeated at the Battle of Boroughbridge, and Edward willing to let them do as they pleased, the Despensers were left unchecked. This maladministration caused hostile feeling for them and, by extension, Edward II. Ultimately, a year after his surrender and imprisonment, Mortimer escaped to France, where he began organizing a new rebellion.

Criminality
Like his father, the younger Despenser was accused of widespread criminality. Amongst other examples, Despenser seized the Welsh lands of his wife's inheritance while ignoring the claims of his two brothers-in-law. He further cheated his sister-in-law Elizabeth de Clare out of Gower and Usk, and forced Alice de Lacy, 4th Countess of Lincoln, to give up her lands to him. He had murdered Llywelyn Bren in 1318 while the Welshman was being held hostage, and during his exile he spent a period of time as a pirate in the English Channel, "a sea monster, lying in wait for merchants as they crossed the sea". In addition he imprisoned Sir William Cokerell in the Tower of London and extorted money from him.

Accusations of sodomy
The 14th-century court historian Jean Froissart wrote that "he was a sodomite", and Adam Orleton, the Bishop of Winchester, also levelled the accusation at him (although Orleton's accusation came when he was defending himself from having claimed the same of King Edward). According to Froissart, Despenser's penis was severed and burned at his execution as a punishment for his sodomy and heresy. In 1326, as Isabella and Mortimer invaded, Orleton gave a sermon in which he publicly denounced Edward, who had fled with Despenser, as a sodomite. The annals of Newenham Abbey in Devon recorded, "the king and his husband" fled to Wales.

Relationship with Isabella and downfall
Queen Isabella had a special dislike for Despenser. While Isabella was in France to negotiate between her husband and the French king, she formed an alliance with Roger Mortimer and began planning an invasion of England, which ultimately came to fruition in September 1326. Their forces numbered only about 1,500 mercenaries to begin with, but the majority of the nobility rallied to them throughout September and October, preferring to stand with them rather than Edward and the hated Despensers.

The Despensers fled west with the King, with a sizeable sum from the treasury; however, the escape was unsuccessful. Separated from the elder Despenser, the King and the younger Despenser were deserted by most of their followers and were captured near Neath in mid-November. King Edward was imprisoned and later forced to abdicate in favour of his son Edward III. The elder Despenser was hanged and then beheaded at Bristol on 27 October 1326, and the younger Despenser was brought to trial.

Trial and execution

Anticipating that he would receive no mercy, Despenser tried to starve himself before his trial, but he was unsuccessful. He did face trial on 24 November 1326, in the market square Hereford, before Roger, Isabella and the Lancastrian lords. William Trussell read out the list of charges. The list included:

He was sentenced to death. As a thief he was sentenced to hanging and as a traitor he was sentenced to being drawn and quartered. 

Despenser was stripped of his clothes and had biblical verses written on his skin before being dragged by four horses across the city to the walls of his own castle where a scaffold had been erected. There he was hung, drawn and quartered in the presence of Isabella, Mortimer and their followers.

In Froissart's account of his execution, Despenser was tied firmly to a ladder and his genitals sliced off and burned while he was still conscious. His entrails were slowly pulled out; finally, his heart was cut out and thrown into a fire. Froissart (or, rather, Jean le Bel's chronicle, on which he relied) is the only source to mention castration; other contemporary accounts have Despenser hanged, drawn and quartered, which usually did not involve emasculation.

Despenser's corpse was decapitated and the head displayed above the gates of London. His torso was cut into four pieces and likewise were displayed above the gates of York, Bristol, Newcastle and Dover.

Remains
Four years later, in December 1330, his widow was given permission to gather and bury Despenser's remains at the family's Gloucestershire estate, but only the head, a thigh bone and a few vertebrae were returned to her.

What may be the remains of Despenser were identified in February 2008 in the village of Abbey Hulton in Staffordshire, the former site of Hulton Abbey. The skeleton, which was first uncovered during archaeological work in the 1970s, appeared to be that of a victim of a drawing and quartering as it had been beheaded and chopped into several pieces with a sharp blade, suggesting a ritual killing. Furthermore, it lacked several body parts, including the ones given to Despenser's wife. Radiocarbon analysis dated the body to between 1050 and 1385, and later tests suggested it to be that of a man over 34 years old; Despenser was 39 at the time of his execution. In addition, the abbey is located on lands that belonged to Hugh Audley, Despenser's brother-in-law, at the time.

Legacy
The Tyranny and Fall of Edward II: 1321–1326 by historian Natalie Fryde is a study of Edward's reign during the years that the Despensers' power was at its peak. Fryde pays particular attention to the subject of the Despensers' ill-gotten landholdings. The numerous accusations against the younger Despenser at the time of his execution have never been the subject of close critical scrutiny, although Roy Martin Haines called them "ingenuous" and noted their propagandistic nature.

Despite the crucial and disastrous role he played in the reign of Edward II, Despenser is almost a minor character in Christopher Marlowe's play Edward II (1592), where, as "Spencer", he is little more than a substitute for the dead Gaveston. Despenser also appears as a character in Maurice Druon's historical fiction series Les Rois maudits, along with its television adaptations. In 2006, he was selected by BBC History Magazine as the 14th century's worst Briton.

References

Sources

Further reading

External links

1280s births
1326 deaths
13th-century English nobility
14th-century English nobility
British and English royal favourites
Executed English people
People convicted under a bill of attainder
People executed under the Plantagenets by hanging, drawing and quartering
People executed under the Plantagenets for treason against England
English pirates
14th-century criminals
Hugh
People knighted at the Feast of the Swans
Burials at Tewkesbury Abbey
Medieval English criminals
Barons le Despencer
Lords of Glamorgan